The Grenada National Party (GNP) was a conservative and economically liberal political party in Grenada that existed from 1955 to 1984, when it merged into the New National Party. It alternated in power with the Grenada United Labour Party (GULP).

History
The party was founded in 1955 and took its support from the urban middle class and landowners. It first contested national elections in 1957 when it won two of the eight seats, tied with the GULP and the People's Democratic Movement. Its leader Herbert Blaize became the island's leader as part of an anti-GULP coalition. Although GULP convincingly won the next elections in 1961, taking eight of the ten seats, early elections were held in 1962, in which the GNP won six of the 10 seats to return to power. It returned to opposition following the 1967 elections. For the 1976 elections it was part of the People's Alliance alongside the New Jewel Movement and the United People's Party. However, they failed to defeat GULP.

In 1984 it merged with the National Democratic Party and the Grenada Democratic Movement to form the New National Party, with Blaize as its leader.

Electoral history

House of Representatives elections

References 

Political parties in Grenada
Political parties established in 1955
Political parties disestablished in 1984
1955 establishments in Grenada
1984 disestablishments in Grenada
Conservative parties